There's No Bones in Ice Cream is the third album by American comedian Chris Rush. The album was released in 1997 on Sundazed Music.

Track listing
 Living in New York (Punk Pigeon) (King Kong Blues) – 4:48
 Insanity (Bungee Jumping) (Meeting The Lion) (Wacko, Texas) – 4:46
 Murder Rate (Killer Apes) (Natural Born Killers) (Peeing On The Butt) (Old Man River) (Don Testosteroni) – 5:45
 Macho (Dragonfly Love) (Naked Hang Gliding) (Sperm Whale's Peepee) (Snakes) – 4:29
 PMS (Estrogen's Gift) (God's Sense Of Humor) (Baboon's Ass) – 3:12
 War on Drugs (Cigarettes & Booze) (Twinkie Warehouse) (Altered States) (Cave Man Dreams) (Sodom & Gomorrah) (Cannibalism) – 10:52
 Happiness & Shame (Earthquake Boogie) (Bomba The Gorilla) – 4:46
 Terror (The Big Stone Ball) – 2:35
 Vegetarianism (Eating The Dumb) – 1:26
 Aliens (Farting In The Tub) (Einstein Meets E.T.) (The Intergalactic Fur Company) – 9:50
 Reincarnation – 1:18
 The Killer Bees – 1:25
 Boogers – 2:36

Personnel
 Vic Anesini - Engineer
 Peter Robertson - Engineer
 Rich Russell - Package Design
 Jeff Smith - Package Design
 Ghasem Ebrahimian - Photos
 Tim Livingston - Project Manager

References

1997 albums
Sundazed Records albums
Chris Rush albums
1990s comedy albums